Impressions of the Middle East is an album by American jazz flautist Herbie Mann recorded for the Atlantic label and released in 1967.

Reception

AllMusic awarded the album 4½ stars.

Track listing
All compositions by Herbie Mann except as indicated
 "Turkish Coffee" - 5:00
 "Incense" - 7:18
 "Odalisque" (Arif Mardin) - 7:40
 "Do Wah Diddy Diddy" (Ellie Greenwich, Jeff Barry) - 2:36
 "Uskudar" (Traditional; arranged by Arif Mardin) - 3:37
 "The Oud and the Pussycat" - 5:03
 "Yavuz" (Traditional; arranged by Arif Mardin) - 4:36
 "Dance of the Semites" - 4:27
 "Eli Eli" (Traditional; arranged by Torrie Zito) - 3:56	
Recorded in New York City on March 7, 1966 (tracks 5, 7 & 8), March 22, 1966 (tracks 4 & 6), April 5, 1966 (track 9) and November 9, 1966 (tracks 1-3)

Personnel 
Herbie Mann - flutes
Jimmy Owens - trumpet, flugelhorn (tracks 4-9) 
Joseph Orange, Julian Priester - trombone (tracks 4 & 6) 
 Hachig Thomas Kazarian - clarinet (tracks 4-8)
Mohammed Elakkad - zither (tracks 4-8)
Chick Ganimian - oud (tracks 1-8)
Gloria Agostini - harp (track 9)
Roy Ayers - vibraphone (tracks 1-3)
Attila Zoller - guitar (tracks 4 & 6)
Richard Davis (track 9), Reggie Workman (tracks 4-8) - bass 
Bruno Carr (tracks 1-8), Mel Lewis (track 9) - drums
 Moulay "Ali" Hafid (tracks 5, 7 & 8), Robert Marashlian (tracks 5, 7 & 8), Carlos "Patato" Valdes (tracks 1-4, 6 & 9), Phil Kraus (track 9), Hachig Thomas Kazarian (tracks 1-3), Geraldine Swee (tracks 1-3)  - percussion
Aaron Rosand, Alan Shulman, Alfred Brown, Anahid Ajemian, Bernard Eichen, Charles Libove, Charles McCracken, David Mankowitz, David Nadien, Emanuel Vardi, George Ockner, George Ricci, Jack Zayde, Karen Tuttle, Leo Kahn, Leo Kruczek, Marvin Morgenstern, Max Pollikoff, Raoul Poliakin, Sylvan Shulman, Tosha Samaroff - strings (track 9)
Arif Mardin, Torrie Zito - arranger, conductor
Technical
Bruce Tergesen, Phil Iehle, Tom Dowd - engineer
Marvin Israel - design

References 

1967 albums
Herbie Mann albums
Albums produced by Nesuhi Ertegun
Albums produced by Arif Mardin
Atlantic Records albums
Albums arranged by Arif Mardin
Albums arranged by Torrie Zito